Arvo Ojalehto (born 17 April 1957) is a Finnish weightlifter. He competed at the 1980 Summer Olympics, the 1984 Summer Olympics and the 1988 Summer Olympics.

Major results

References

External links
 

1957 births
Living people
Finnish male weightlifters
Olympic weightlifters of Finland
Weightlifters at the 1980 Summer Olympics
Weightlifters at the 1984 Summer Olympics
Weightlifters at the 1988 Summer Olympics
People from Haapavesi
Sportspeople from North Ostrobothnia
20th-century Finnish people
21st-century Finnish people